The name Mingus may refer to: 
 Charles Mingus (1922–1979), jazz composer and double bass player
 Sue Mingus, wife of the jazz composer
 Mingus (Charles Mingus album), 1961 album by Charles Mingus
 Mingus (Joni Mitchell album), 1979 jazz album by Joni Mitchell with Charles Mingus
 Mingus Mingus Mingus Mingus Mingus, 1963 album by Charles Mingus
 Mingus Reedus, son of American actor Norman Reedus
 Mingus, Texas, a city
 Mingus Mountain, in the Black Hills of Arizona
 Mingus Lookout Complex, a fire tower lookout complex in Prescott National Forest, Arizona
 Max Mingus, a character in a series of books by British thriller writer Nick Stone